Sophie Day (born 2 September 1998) is an Australian cricketer who plays as a left-handed batter and slow left-arm orthodox bowler for Victoria in the Women's National Cricket League (WNCL) and the Melbourne Stars in the Women's Big Bash League (WBBL). She played in fifteen matches for the Stars in the 2020–21 WBBL season and two matches for Victoria in the 2020–21 WNCL season. She played county cricket for Berkshire in 2019.

Off the field, Day is an artist who has studied Fine Arts at the Victorian College of the Arts, the arts school of the University of Melbourne.

References

External links

Sophie Day at Cricket Australia

1998 births
Living people
Australian women cricketers
Berkshire women cricketers
Melbourne Stars (WBBL) cricketers
Victoria women cricketers
Place of birth missing (living people)